Sheila García Gómez (born 15 March 1997) is a Spanish professional footballer who plays as a right back for Liga F club Atlético Madrid and the Spain women's national team.

References

1993 births
Living people
Sportspeople from the Province of Guadalajara
Footballers from Castilla–La Mancha
Spanish women's footballers
Women's association football forwards
Primera División (women) players
Rayo Vallecano Femenino players
Spain women's international footballers
Atlético Madrid
UEFA Women's Euro 2022 players
21st-century Spanish women